The  was one of eight ministries of the Japanese imperial court.

History 
It was established by the Taihō Code of early 8th century. The ministry was replaced in the Meiji period.

The ministry was renamed Mombushō for a brief number of years after 758, but the original name was restored in 764. The name has since remained unchanged until the Ritsuryō system was abandoned during the Meiji period.

Shikibu-shō is also where the Lady Murasaki Shikibu derives her name, probably owing to the senior secretary post that her father and her husband once occupied in the ministry. It is also the origin of the name of Shikike, one of the four great branches of the Fujiwara clan.

Today's organisation is the Board of Ceremonies, a department of the Imperial Household Agency.

Name 
The "Ministry of Ceremonial," can arguably be considered the standard translation, as Japanologist Sir George Bailey Sansom wrote in 1932 that this was "the usual rendering in English", as well as being the coinage later adopted in the Appendix to Helen Craig McCullough's Eiga monogatari, which remains as the standard "followed by numerous English-language authors" according to a more recent assessment.

However, Sansom issued the caveat that the use of the word "ceremony" is potentially misleading. Its function is not purely ceremonial, as will be discussed under the #Functions section. Given the dilemma, some commentators have chosen to apply an English name that attempted at a description of the true function, rather than a faithful literal translation. Further discussion, and a compilation of the numerous alternate English names are given in the section #List of translated aliases.

Functions 
Sansom explains that Shiki actually denotes the "detailed procedure for the enforcement of ryō (the administrative code, as in Ritsuryō)". For this reason, applying "the word 'ceremonial' is a little misleading" he warns.

The minister, or the  had the grave authority to grade the performances of civil officers, recommend their appointments and awards, and decide on their ceremonial seniorities and privileges.

Sansom called it the "Bureau of Court Ranks".

Organisation 
The  was headed by the minister, whose office was ordinarily filled by a son or close relative of the emperor, of the fourth grade or higher.

  - "Minister of Ceremonial Affairs"
aliases: "Chief administrator of the ministry of civil services"

  - "Senior Assistant Minister of Ceremonial"
aliases: "Vice-Minister"
 
  - "Junior Assistant Minister of Ceremonial"
aliases: "Junior Vice-Minister"

  (x 2) - "Senior Secretaries"
Sometimes concurrently held by a  "Chamberlain of sixth grade" who then gained special privilege to ascend to the imperial court.
When irregularly occupied by a fifth rank, it bears the aliases:  "A Secretary in the Ministry of Ceremonial who has been raised to the Fifth Rank"; ;  "Senior Secretary of the Fifth Rank".

 (x 2) - "Junior Secretaries"
 (x 1) - "Senior Recorder"
 (x 3) - "Junior Recorders"
 (x 20) - "Scribes"
 (x 2) - "Office keepers"
 (x 80) - "Servants"

Under the Ministry were two bureaus.

Office holders

Ministers 
The  or Minister 
Fujiwara no Umakai (appointed <724), held this office, and the branch of the Fujiwara clan which he founded was named Shikke after him.

 (<943) held this office, which earned him the   after the fancier name of the office written in Tang dynasty Chinese style. The same prince wrote a diary entitled The

Vice-ministers

 969, though the man also nicknamed the  held numerous offices.

The junior vice ministership was once held by Sugawara no Michizane 877, also known as the deified Tenjin.

Secretaries

The father of Lady Murasaki, Fujiwara no Tametoki (984) was appointed Senior Secretary.   (1004) who appears in Sei Shōnagon's The Pillow Book is another example.

As were Tametoki and Tadataka just mentioned, men who concurrently held Shikibu-no-daijō with another office of  "Chamberlain of sixth grade" gained special permission to ascend the court, and were addressed as   "

List of translated aliases
Shikibu-shō has been rendered into English in numerous ways. These many aliases can for convenience's sake be categorized into either a "literal" translation camp or "semantic" translation camp, as Versucher (2008) has suggested in a review article:
"In general, authors writing in English translate Japanese offices either literally, like “Ministry of Rites” (sic.) for Shikibushô (McCullough and McCullough), or semantically, like “Ministry of Personnel” for the same Shikibushô (Joan Piggott, The Emergence of Japanese Kingship, Stanford University Press, 1997)."

Versucher's article quoted above notes that the translations of medieval Japanese offices appended in Helen Craig McCullough and her husband's translation of Eiga monogatari are "followed by numerous English-language authors", and the McCulloughs translate Shikibu-shō as "Ministry of Ceremonial".

literal
 Bureau of Ceremonials
 Ceremonial Department
 Department of Ceremonial
 Department of Ceremonial (or Rites)
 Department of Rites and Ceremonies 
 Ceremonies Ministry 
 Ministry of Ceremonial 
 Ministry of Ceremonials 
 Ministry of Ceremony 
 Ministry of Ceremonies 
 Ministry of Rites

semantic
 Department of Civil Affairs and Education 
 Ministry of Civil Administration
 Ministry of Civil Services
 Ministry of Personnel

See also
 Daijō-kan

Notes

References

Citations

Bibliography

   (organizational chart)

 — Iowa City, Iowa: University of Iowa Press (1903) Internet Archive, full text
  
   (organizational chart)
  
  
 
  
  (tr. of Nihon Odai Ichiran)
  
 
 Ury, Marian.  (1999). "Chinese Learning and Intellectual Life," The Cambridge history of Japan: Heian Japan. Vol. II. Cambridge: Cambridge University Press.   
 Varley, H. Paul. (1980).  Jinnō Shōtōki: A Chronicle of Gods and Sovereigns. New York: Columbia University Press. ; ;  OCLC 59145842

Japanese sources
 

additional sources used to compile English translated names.
  
  
  
  
  
 
  
 
 
  
  
  

Government of feudal Japan
Meiji Restoration
Former government ministries of Japan